Pudussery West is a census town in the Palakkad district, state of Kerala, India. Pudussery West comes under the administration of the Pudusseri gram panchayat.

Demographics
Pudussery town has a population of 20,140 of which 9,948 are males while 10,192 are females as per report released by Census India 2011.  Moreover, the Child Sex Ratio in Pudussery West is around 1005 compared to the Kerala state average of 964. The literacy rate of Pudussery West is 88.51 %, Male literacy is around 92.44 % while the female literacy rate is 84.67 %. Pudussery West Census Town has total administration over 5,016 houses to which it supplies basic amenities like water and sewerage.  The town is also authorised to build roads within Census Town limits and impose taxes on properties coming under its jurisdiction.

References

 
http://www.citypopulation.de/php/india-kerala.php?cityid=3206-627651
Cities and towns in Palakkad district
Suburbs of Palakkad

External links

Villages in Palakkad district